José Brandão Gonçalves Júnior (born 7 January 1995), known as Júnior Brandão, is a Brazilian professional footballer who plays as a forward for Operário.

Club career

Early career
Born in Ibiúna, São Paulo, Brandão finished his formation with Taboão da Serra. In May 2015, after representing CATS in the 2015 Copa São Paulo de Futebol Júnior, he joined Juventus de Seara in the Campeonato Catarinense Série B.

Brandão made his senior debut on 28 June 2015, playing the last 19 minutes in a 1–1 home draw against Atlético Tubarão. He scored his first goals seven days later, netting a brace in a 9–0 home routing of Blumenau. On 29 July, he scored a hat-trick in a 3–2 home win against Operário de Mafra.

On 23 September 2015, Brandão signed for Série D side Ypiranga-RS, and featured rarely as his side achieved promotion to Série C.

Júnior Brandão played for Boa Esporte and Ferroviária during the 2016 campaign, both featuring sparingly. On 8 December of that year he agreed to a contract with Novo Hamburgo for the ensuing Campeonato Gaúcho, and contributed with one goal in only two matches as his side lifted the trophy.

On 11 August 2017, Brandão moved to Primavera, but his side was knocked out of the Campeonato Paulista Segunda Divisão just two matches after his arrival. In December, he signed for Iporá.

Atlético Goianiense
On 5 April 2018, Brandão was presented at Atlético Goianiense in Série B. He made his debut for the club on 14 April, coming on as a substitute in a 3–2 home win against Criciúma.

Brandão scored his first goals for Dragão on 25 May 2018, netting a brace in a 2–2 home draw against Oeste. On 11 June, he extended his contract until the end of 2020.

Ludogorets Razgrad
On 22 August 2018, Brandão was transferred to PFC Ludogorets Razgrad.

Loan to Goiás
On 3 January 2019 he returned in Brazil joining Série A team Goiás on loan until end of the year.

Loan to Persepolis 
On 19 August 2019, Júnior Brandão signed a one-year loan contract with Persian Gulf Pro League champions Persepolis. On 28 November 2019, his contract with Persepolis was terminated due to poor performance.

Loan to Atlético Goianiense 
On 21 February 2020, Brandão returned to Brazilian club Atlético Goianiense on a loan deal until the end of the season.

Loan to Rio Ave 
On February 1 2021, Brandão moved to Primeira Liga side Rio Ave, on a loan deal for the remainder of the season.

Career statistics

Honours
Club
Campeonato Gaúcho: 2017

References

External links

1995 births
Living people
Footballers from São Paulo (state)
Brazilian footballers
Association football forwards
Campeonato Brasileiro Série A players
Campeonato Brasileiro Série B players
Campeonato Brasileiro Série D players
Second Professional Football League (Bulgaria) players
Persian Gulf Pro League players
Ypiranga Futebol Clube players
Boa Esporte Clube players
Associação Ferroviária de Esportes players
Esporte Clube Novo Hamburgo players
Atlético Clube Goianiense players
Goiás Esporte Clube players
PFC Ludogorets Razgrad players
PFC Ludogorets Razgrad II players
Persepolis F.C. players
Rio Ave F.C. players
Clube de Regatas Brasil players
Brazilian expatriate footballers
Brazilian expatriate sportspeople in Bulgaria
Brazilian expatriate sportspeople in Iran
Brazilian expatriate sportspeople in Portugal
Expatriate footballers in Bulgaria
Expatriate footballers in Iran
Expatriate footballers in Portugal